19 Dutch is a residential building in the Financial District neighborhood of Manhattan, New York City. The building was developed by Carmel Partners and was designed by GK+V, with SLCE Architects as the architect of record. GK+V also designed the nearby 5 Beekman. The building contains 482 units and retail space on the first several floors.
Amancio Ortega,  founder of  Zara,  agreed in July 2022 to buy 19 Dutch via his holding firm Pontegadea  for about $500 million.

References

Residential buildings in Manhattan
Residential skyscrapers in Manhattan
Residential buildings completed in 2019